Frederick A. Zautcke was a member of the Wisconsin State Assembly during the 1870 and 1876 sessions. A Republican, he represented the 10th District of Milwaukee County, Wisconsin. Zautcke was born on July 25, 1837, in Prussia.

References

German emigrants to the United States
People from Milwaukee County, Wisconsin
Republican Party members of the Wisconsin State Assembly
1837 births
Year of death missing